Mukhammadjon Nurulloevich Loiqov (born 14 April 1998) is a Tajikistani professional football player who currently plays for Molodechno.

Career

Club
Prior to the 2020 Belarusian Premier League season, Loiqov signed for Energetik-BGU Minsk.

International
Loiqov made his senior team debut on 16 December 2018 against Oman.

Career statistics

Club

International

Statistics accurate as of match played 16 December 2018

References

External links
 
 

1998 births
Living people
Sportspeople from Dushanbe
Tajikistani footballers
Tajikistan international footballers
Tajikistani expatriate footballers
Expatriate footballers in Belarus
Tajikistani expatriate sportspeople in Belarus
Association football forwards
FC UAS Zhitkovichi players
FC Dinamo Minsk players
FC Belshina Bobruisk players
FC Energetik-BGU Minsk players
FC Lida players
FC Molodechno players